Terastia egialealis is a moth in the family Crambidae and subfamily Spilomelinae. The species was first described by Francis Walker in 1859. It is found in India, China, Nepal, Thailand, West Malaysia, Sumatra, Java, Borneo, and Sulawesi.

References

Spilomelinae
Crambidae
Moths described in 1859
Moths of Borneo
Moths of Malaysia
Moths of Asia